Ballophilus clavicornis is a species of arthropod in the genus Ballophilus. It is found in Liberia. The original description of this species is based on specimens with 63 to 73 pairs of legs.

References 

Ballophilidae
Animals described in 1896
Invertebrates of West Africa